The Pskov Krom, also known as the Pskov Kremlin, is an ancient citadel in Pskov, Russia. In the central part of the city, the Krom is located at the junction of the Velikaya and Pskova rivers.   The citadel is of medieval origin, with the surrounding walls constructed starting in the late 15th century.

The Krom was the administrative and spiritual centre of the Pskov Republic in the 15th century.

In 2010, two of the towers of the Krom (the Vlasyevskaya, which dates to the 15th or 16th century, and the Rybnitskaya, which dates to 13th or 14th) were damaged in a fire.

It's a Russian nominated candidate site on the UNESCO World Heritage Tentative List under 'Great Pskov' nomination.

References

See also
Trinity Cathedral in Pskov (located within the walls of the Krom)

Pskov
Kremlins
Buildings and structures in Pskov Oblast
Tourist attractions in Pskov Oblast
Cultural heritage monuments of federal significance in Pskov Oblast